Hélio Freitas (born 23 October 1969) is a Brazilian cross-country skier. He competed in the men's 15 kilometre classical event at the 2006 Winter Olympics.

References

1969 births
Living people
Brazilian male cross-country skiers
Olympic cross-country skiers of Brazil
Cross-country skiers at the 2006 Winter Olympics
Sportspeople from Porto Alegre
21st-century Brazilian people